= Simon Olivier =

Dutch chemist (1879-1961)

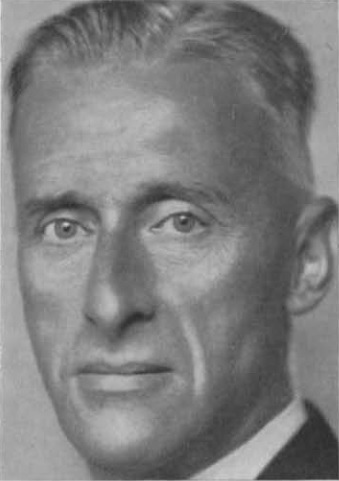
- Born: 13 June 1879; Amsterdam
- Died: 9 August 1961 (aged 82); Wageningen, The Netherlands
- Education: Delft University of Technology (doctorate 1913)
- Scientific career
- Institutions: Wageningen Agricultural College, National Agricultural Research Station in Groningen
- Thesis: Snelheidsmetingen bij de reactie van Friedel en Crafts (Velocity measurements in the reaction of Friedel and Crafts)
- Doctoral advisor: nl:Jacob Böeseken

Simon Cornelis Johannes Olivier (Amsterdam, June 13, 1879 – Wageningen, August 9, 1961) was a Dutch chemist. He was professor at the Wageningen Agricultural College (predecessor of what is currently Wageningen University) from 1919 to 1949. During the Second World War he was imprisoned for almost two years for his resistance against the German occupier.

== Career ==
Olivier studied chemistry at the Delft University of Technology. He received his doctorate in 1913 cum laude (“with high distinction”) as a doctor of technical science for his study of “Velocity measurements in the reaction of Friedel and Crafts” [translated from Dutch]. He subsequently worked as an assistant at the National Agricultural Research Station in Groningen, and as a physics and chemistry teacher at the HBS in Nijmegen. Subsequently, he got a job at the Wageningen Agricultural College. In 1918 he was appointed professor of Organic Chemistry, the first professor of the current Laboratory of Organic Chemistry. Olivier's publications also attracted attention abroad, especially in the field of organic chemistry.

== WWII ==
Olivier was concerned about Nazism well before the German invasion of the Netherlands. Already in 1936 he became a member of the Committee of Vigilance of Anti-National Socialist Intellectuals. He also advocated admission of Jewish refugees from Nazi Germany.

Olivier was one of the few employees of the Wageningen Agricultural College who objected when they were asked to hand in an Aryan declaration in 1940. According to him, the statement was "the introduction of discrimination against Jews in the Netherlands". When he was informed that this could give him terrorist status, he crossed out the form and completed a new questionnaire. Nevertheless, Olivier continued to speak out against National Socialist ideas.

After members of the National Socialist Movement (in Dutch: NSB) –a Dutch fascist movement that affiliated with the Nazis– had plastered Wageningen on July 18, 1941 with notes from the German V-action (the taking over of 'V=Victory' by the Germans “because Germany is winning on all fronts”) and especially the main building of the Wageningen Agricultural College, Olivier ordered a worker to remove everything. A few days later he was taken into custody. After 11 months in prison in Amersfoort, where, as he put it, “he became more closely acquainted with the methods the Germans use to bring opponents to reason”, he was dismissed from his academic position and expelled from Wageningen. He was initially locked up in the infamous Oranjehotel in Scheveningen, and subsequently imprisoned in various German concentration camps until 1943, when he was released due to his poor health. However, Olivier was banned from publishing and was no longer allowed to appear in university cities.

== Post WWII ==
After the war, Olivier was appointed Rector Magnificus of the Wageningen Agricultural College for the year 1945-1946. He had previously been rector in Wageningen in the academic year 1923-1924. Olivier retired in 1949.
